Waikavirus is a genus of viruses in the order Picornavirales, in the family Secoviridae. Plants, poaceae, cyperaceae, and gramineae serve as natural hosts. There are four species in this genus. Diseases associated with this genus include: MCDV: plant stunting and chlorotic striping of tertiary leaf veins in maize.

Taxonomy
The genus contains the following species:
 Anthriscus yellows virus
 Bellflower vein chlorosis virus
 Maize chlorotic dwarf virus
 Rice tungro spherical virus

Structure
Viruses in Waikavirus are non-enveloped, with icosahedral geometries, and T=pseudo3 symmetry. The diameter is around 30 nm. Genomes are linear, around 12kb in length.

Life cycle
Viral replication is cytoplasmic. Entry into the host cell is achieved by penetration into the host cell. Replication follows the positive stranded RNA virus replication model. Positive stranded RNA virus transcription is the method of transcription. The virus exits the host cell by tubule-guided viral movement.
Plants, poaceae, cyperaceae, and gramineae serve as the natural host. The virus is transmitted via a vector (insects). Transmission routes are vector and mechanical.

References

External links
 Viralzone: Waikavirus
 ICTV

Secoviridae
Virus genera